Barzeh may refer to:
 Barzeh, Kermanshah
 Barzeh, Lorestan
 Barzeh, Syria

See also 
 Barzah (disambiguation)